The men's decathlon competition featured as part of the athletics programme at the 1968 Summer Olympics and was held at the Estadio Olímpico Universitario in Mexico City on 18 and 19 October.

American Bill Toomey won the gold medal with an Olympic record score of 8193 points. Two West German athletes, Hans-Joachim Walde and Kurt Bendlin, took the silver and bronze medals, respectively.

A total of 33 competitors from 20 nations entered the decathlon with 19 athletes managing to finish all events at the competition.

The ten-event track and field competition used hand timing in the track events and was scored using the 1962 scoring method. The youngest competitor was Don Vélez (aged 20) and the oldest was Valbjörn Þorláksson (aged 34). The sixth-placer Tom Waddell, representing the United States, later went on to found the Gay Olympics.

Schedule

Overall summary

References

External links
Official 1968 Olympic Games Report (pg. 114). International Olympic Committee. Retrieved on 2013-07-02.

Decathlon
1968
Men's events at the 1968 Summer Olympics